The Bocas del Toro Archipelago is a group of islands in the Caribbean Sea in the northwest of Panama. The archipelago separates Almirante Bay and Chiriquí Lagoon from the open Caribbean Sea. The archipelago is part of the Bocas del Toro District which is part of Bocas del Toro Province. The major city is Bocas del Toro, also called Bocas Town, on Isla Colón. The islands are accessible by water taxis and private boats. Isla Colón is accessible by airplanes, ferries, private boats, and water taxis. Bocas del Toro "Isla Colón" International Airport, located just west of Bocas Town, provides air transportation to and from the islands. Ferries serve Bocas Town from Almirante, Changuinola, and Chiriquí Grande.

Geography

Islands

Islands in the Archipelago include:

 Cayos Zapatilla
 Isla Bastimentos
 Isla Carenero (aka: Careening Cay or Careening Key)
 Isla Cayo Agua
 Isla Colón (main island)
 Isla Cristóbal
 Isla Popa
 Isla Solarte
 Isla Pastores
 Isla Bagui
 Isla Split Hill
The archipelago also includes 50 cays and some 200 tiny islets.

Protected Areas

 Isla Bastimentos National Marine Park
 Mimi Timbi
 Palo Seco
 Playa Bluff
 La Amistad (Pila)

Settlements

 Bocas del Toro (Bocas Town)
 Bastimentos (Isla Bastimentos)
 Salt Creek (Isla Bastimentos)
 Punta Laurel (Isla Bastimentos)

Climate

See also
 List of islands of Panama
 Atlantic Ocean
 Panama
 Districts of Panama
 List of islands in the Caribbean: Panama

Outline of Panama
Index of Panama-related articles
List of cities in Panama

Notes

External links 
 BocasDelToro.com OFFICIAL WEBSITE - Everything about Bocas del Toro

References

Archipelagoes of Panama
Archipelagoes of the Caribbean Sea
Panamanian coasts of the Caribbean Sea
Bocas del Toro Province
Districts of Panama